Brigadier James Osmond Furner,  (25 November 1927 – 17 September 2007) was an Australian military intelligence officer, who was the longest serving Director-General of the Australian Secret Intelligence Service (ASIS) from 1984 to 1992.

Military career
After completing a Bachelor of Arts degree at the University of Melbourne and working as a school teacher, Furner embarked on a career change and enlisted in the Australian Army, becoming one of the first cadets to be trained at the Officer Cadet School, Portsea. On completion of his training, Furner joined the Royal Australian Infantry Corps where he was posted overseas with the 1st Commonwealth Division in South Korea from 1955 to 1956.

In 1982, Furner joined the Joint Intelligence Organisation as deputy director, and retired from the army to take the civilian post of director a few months later.

Australian Secret Intelligence Service
In February 1984, Minister for Foreign Affairs, Bill Hayden, asked Furner to take the role of Director-General of the Australian Secret Intelligence Service in an acting capacity. The appointment was made permanent in late July 1985 and Furner served in the role until November 1992.

References

1927 births
2007 deaths
Military personnel from Victoria (Australia)
Australian brigadiers
Australian Commanders of the Order of the British Empire
Australian military personnel of the Vietnam War
Directors-General of the Australian Secret Intelligence Service
Graduates of the Officer Cadet School, Portsea
Officers of the Order of Australia
People from Warragul
Recipients of the Distinguished Service Medal (Australia)
University of Melbourne alumni